Pedro Manuel Araújo Mesquita (born 10 May 1970) is a Portuguese retired footballer who played as a right back, and the current assistant manager of UD Almería B.

References

External links

1970 births
Living people
Portuguese footballers
Association football defenders
Primeira Liga players
Liga Portugal 2 players
Leixões S.C. players
Rio Ave F.C. players
Leça F.C. players
Gil Vicente F.C. players
Associação Naval 1º de Maio players
Portuguese football managers
Portuguese expatriate sportspeople in Spain